Pure Genius (originally titled Bunker Hill) is an American medical drama television series created by Jason Katims that aired on CBS from October 27, 2016 to January 26, 2017. The series stars Augustus Prew as James Bell, who is a Silicon Valley tech billionaire, and Dermot Mulroney as Dr. Walter Wallace. It was produced by True Jack Production, CBS Television Studios and Universal Television. In May 2017, CBS cancelled the series after one season.

Premise
James Bell is a Silicon Valley billionaire who dreams of building a hospital with ultimate cutting-edge technology to treat rare and incurable diseases. He partners with a maverick surgeon, Dr. Walter Wallace, who leads the effort in clearing out the bureaucracy of medicine, and focus on forward thinking, advancing technology, and saving lives—at no cost to the patient.

Cast and characters
 Augustus Prew as James Bell, a Silicon Valley tech billionaire who opens Bunker Hill
 Dermot Mulroney as Dr. Walter Wallace
 Odette Annable as Dr. Zoe Brockett, double board-certified doctor of pediatrics and critical care
 Reshma Shetty as Dr. Talaikha Channarayapatra, neurosurgeon
 Brenda Song as Angie Cheng, Bunker Hill's Chief Biomedical Engineer
 Aaron Jennings as Dr. Malik Verlaine, head of the Ehub which performs remote monitoring of patients
 Ward Horton as Dr. Scott Strauss, an Ivy League–educated neurologist and Catholic priest

Episodes

Production

Development
On January 22, 2016, it was announced that CBS had given the pilot order known as Bunker Hill. The episode was written and authored by Jason Katims who was expected to be an executive producer, alongside Sarah Watson, David Semel and Michelle Lee. Production companies involved with the pilot include True Jack Productions, CBS Television Studios and Universal Television. The show was ordered at the CBS upfronts 2016 to air in the network's 2016–17 TV schedule and was officially picked up on May 13, 2016. A few days later, it was announced that it would premiere by October 27, 2016 and air on Thursdays at 10:00 P.M. On August 10, 2016, it was announced that the series name was changed from Bunker Hill to Pure Genius.

On November 21, 2016, CBS announced that it would not order more episodes than the 13 episodes commissioned. The production for the first season wrapped on December 15, 2016, and the remaining commissioned episodes were broadcast for the remainder of its run.

On May 17, 2017, Pure Genius was cancelled after one season by CBS.

Casting
In February 2016, it was announced that Brenda Song, Dermot Mulroney, Reshma Shetty and Ward Horton had been cast in the pilot's leading roles. Although the pilot was ordered, in March 2016 it was reported that Aaron Jennings and Odette Annable had joined the cast.

Reception

Critical reception
Pure Genius has received generally negative reviews from television critics. Review aggregator website Rotten Tomatoes reported a 26% rating based on reviews from 23 critics. The website's consensus reads, "Pure Genius is weighed down by stereotypical doctor drama trappings, suffocating its chances of bringing anything compelling and entertaining to the genre." Metacritic reported a score of 43 out of 100 based on 19 reviews, indicating "mixed or average reviews".

Willa Paskin of Slate described the show as "idiotic tech propaganda that’s about one-tenth as curious about the issues it raises as it should be." They characterized the show as featuring implausible science and technologies where workers have no regard for patient privacy, and James as a contemptuous CEO-type character who is consistently more confident than Bunker Hill's medical professionals.

Ratings

References

External links
 
 

2016 American television series debuts
2017 American television series endings
2010s American drama television series
2010s American LGBT-related drama television series
2010s American medical television series
CBS original programming
English-language television shows
Television series by CBS Studios
Television series by Universal Television